Statistics of Danish National Football Tournament in the 1924/1925 season.

Province tournament

First round
IK Viking Rønne 2-6 Boldklubben 1901

Second round
Boldklubben 1901 3-1 Korsør Boldklub
Odense Boldklub 3-4 Aarhus Gymnastikforening

Third round
Boldklubben 1901 1-4 Aarhus Gymnastikforening

Copenhagen Championship

Final
Kjøbenhavns Boldklub 9-2 Aarhus Gymnastikforening

References
Denmark - List of final tables (RSSSF)

Top level Danish football league seasons
1924–25 in Danish football
Denmark